Pop Life was a Philippine lifestyle and entertainment television channel owned by Asian Cable Communications.

On March 21, 2020, Pop Life TV ceased broadcasting due to the community quarantine amid the COVID-19 pandemic, stating it was temporary.

Final programming
Pop Life's programming line-up comprises travel, lifestyle, infotainment, docuseries, animated, as well as locally produced programs and religious programs.

List of programs broadcast by Pop Life TV 
Note: Titles are arranged based on categories

Travel 

 Cities of the World 
Festivals of the World 
#MissAdventures
The $100 Nomad
This Weekend

Animated 

 The Flying House
 Veggietales
 Dino Rampage
 Superbook

Local 

 Mga Munting Ilaw
 How To Be You Po?
Libangan ni Juan
 Max Lucado Travelling Light

Docuseries 

 The Traffickers
 Movie Stars
 Pop Profiles
 Rock Legends

Infotainment 

 Motorvision TV
 The Q You
 4X4

Religious 

 Lighthouse Cafe
Pope: The Most Powerful Man in History 
 GCTV Block
 The Pulpit

Lifestyle 

 A is for Apple
The Art of Everything
Flour Power Flour Power
One World Kitchen
The Taste
Vanishing Foods 
 The Traffickers
 The Great Christmas Light Fight

Music 
Pop Tunes

Infomercials 
TV Shop Philippines

References

External links 

 Pop Life Official Website
YuneOH Events Official Website
 BEAM TV 
ACCION INC. Official Website

Television networks in the Philippines
Defunct television networks in the Philippines
Television channels and stations established in 2018